The World's Peace Jubilee and International Musical Festival of 1872 took place in the Back Bay area of Boston, Massachusetts.  Patrick Sarsfield Gilmore directed the festival, which lasted some 18 days. The jubilee honored the ending of the Franco-Prussian War.

Brief history 

For this well-publicized, high-profile, widely anticipated event, architect William G. Preston designed the "colosseum, with a seating capacity of 100,000, ...erected at a cost of half a million dollars." J.H. Wilcox & Co. designed the 43-foot high pipe organ. At opening ceremonies on June 17, 1872, before some 15,000 spectators, Phillips Brooks presented a prayer and Boston mayor William Gaston and Nathaniel Prentice Banks gave speeches. "Unfortunately the size of the building and the din of the workmen caused passages of the prayer and speeches to be inaudible."

Many musicians performed at the jubilee. During the festival "the bands of the Grenadier guards, from London, of the Garde republicaine, from Paris, of the Kaiser Franz regiment, from Berlin, and a band from Dublin, Ireland: with Johann Strauss, the waltz-king, Franz Abt, the German song-writer, and many famous soloists, vocal and instrumental, were among the foreign attractions." One concert featured a "performance of Verdi's Il Trovatore by a 2,000-member orchestra, conducted by Johann Strauss, Jr., and 100 assistants, accompanied by a 20,000-voice chorus." The members of the chorus came "from all parts of the Union," and were directed by Carl Zerrahn. A new piece, titled Festival Hymn: Peace and Music, was composed for this Jubilee by American composer, Dudley Buck.

The Fisk University Jubilee Singers also gave a concert, the first time African American "singers [were] included in a big musical production" in the country. Johann Strauss performed on violin: "All eyes were riveted upon the expressive face and the almost eloquent arm of Herr Strauss. Every ear was strained to catch a sound from the violin on which he ever and anon laid the bow with a passion and surety unexcelled. A storm of applause marked the conclusion of the waltz, which was at once re-demanded and heard anew." Other performers included pianist Franz Bendel; vocalist Madame Rudersdorff; the United States Marine Band; Arabella Goddard; and Madame Peschka-Leutner.

The jubilee provided au courant "Press and Telegraph Rooms ...furnished with all desirable accommodations for the members of the press, while the telegraphic facilities are ample for communicating with all parts of the world."

Despite enthusiastic audiences, the festival suffered financially, partly from lower-than-expected attendance, and partly from setbacks during construction of the building. Some attendees responded negatively to the experience overall. John Dwight wrote in his influential periodical Dwight's Journal of Music: "The great, usurping, tyrannizing, noisy and pretentious thing is over, and there is a general feeling of relief, as if a heavy, brooding nightmare had been lifted from us all." However, the enormousness of the 1872 international jubilee in terms of audience, publicity, and programming created a precedent which served to inspire similar festivals in later years.

Music associated with the festival 
 Franz Abt. Hymn of Peace. Boston: Oliver Ditson & Co., 1872.
 Dudley Buck. Festival Hymn. Boston: Oliver Ditson & Co., 1872.
 Alberto Randegger. 150th Psalm. Boston: Oliver Ditson & Co., 1872.
 Johann Strauss II. Jubilee Waltz. Springfield, Mass.: Fay Hoadly, 1872.
 Julius Benedict. Our victorious banner. Boston: Ditson & Co., ca.1872.
 Alfred E Warren. Inman Line march. Boston: Louis P. Goullaud, 1872.
 Music to be performed at the World's Peace Jubilee and International Musical Festival: in Boston, June, 1872. Boston: O. Ditson, 1872.
 Supplement, containing music written expressly for (but not received in time to be performed at the) World's Peace Jubilee. Boston: Oliver Ditson & Co., 1872.

Images

See also 
 National Peace Jubilee

References

Further reading 
 Local intelligence: the Peace Jubilee. Boston Daily Globe, Mar 4, 1872. p. 8.
 World's Peace Jubilee. Boston Daily Globe. Apr 22, 1872. p. 4.
 The Jubilee coliseum down; Fall of the Towers and Trusses During a Fresh Breeze No One Injured. New York Times, Apr 27, 1872. p. 1.
 Boston's disappointment; The Fall of the Jubilee Coliseum The Plan to be Changed (From the Boston Advertiser, April 27). New York Times, Apr 29, 1872. p. 8.
 
 The Jubilee; Yesterday's Performance at the Coliseum—The English Band the Lions of the Occasion. New York Times, Jun 22, 1872. p. 5
 The Jubilee in Boston A Dull Day and a Small Audience. New York Times, Jun 25, 1872. p. 1.
 The Jubilee; Largest Attendance Since the Opening Cordial Reception of the President by the Audience The Performance. New York Times, Jun 26, 1872. p. 5.
 The Musical World, v.50. August 17, 1872.

External links 

 Boston Public Library. Photos by Charles Pollock:
 Boston Coliseum
 Sitting room
 Boston Coliseum interior
World's Peace Jubilee music

Cultural history of Boston
Festivals in Boston
Peace festivals
1872 in music
Former buildings and structures in Boston
Back Bay, Boston
19th century in Boston
1872 in Massachusetts